Carex kiotensis is a tussock-forming species of perennial sedge in the family Cyperaceae. It is native to parts of Japan and Taiwan.

See also
List of Carex species

References

kiotensis
Taxa named by Adrien René Franchet
Taxa named by Ludovic Savatier
Plants described in 1878
Flora of Japan
Flora of Taiwan